LIghtweight Heavy is 2004 studio album by Fat Jon the Ample Soul Physician. It peaked at number 6 on CMJ's RPM chart.

Critical reception
Matt Whalley of AllMusic gave the album 4.5 stars out of 5 and called it "a downtempo album with a unique style." He said, "Fat Jon uses all the elements of a generic downtempo album but does it with a deliberate style and to greater effect." Jon Freer of XLR8R said, "Lightweight Heavy merges the hopped-up swagger of blunted beats with ear-pleasing and beautiful melodies." He described it as "a commendable album full of slow-stepping, melody-rich cuts, steeped in instrumental hip-hop's teapot."

Track listing

References

External links
 

2004 albums
Fat Jon albums
Instrumental hip hop albums
Albums produced by Fat Jon